Joseph Hill (1715–1784) was a well-known violin maker working in London.

He apprenticed in the workshop of Peter Wamsley and produced fine violins, typically following the style of the Amatis.  He was the first of many great London-based makers in the Hill family, including the firm W. E. Hill & Sons.

References

1715 births
1784 deaths
Bowed string instrument makers
Merchants from London